The Raritan Valley Line is a commuter rail service operated by New Jersey Transit (NJT) which serves passengers in municipalities in Union, Somerset, Middlesex and Hunterdon counties in the Raritan Valley region in central New Jersey, United States. The line's most frequent western terminus is Raritan station in Raritan. Some weekday trains continue farther west and terminate at the High Bridge station, located in High Bridge. Most eastbound trains terminate in Newark; passengers bound for New York make a cross-platform transfer. A limited number of weekday trains continue directly to New York.

Raritan Valley Line trains use three lines owned by three entities. Between High Bridge and the Aldene Connection, east of Cranford, it uses the former Central Railroad of New Jersey Main Line, now owned by New Jersey Transit and also called the Raritan Valley Line. From the Aldene Connection to Hunter it uses Conrail's Lehigh Line, formerly the east end of Lehigh Valley Railroad Main Line. Finally, it uses Amtrak's Northeast Corridor from the Hunter Connection to Newark and New York.

The Raritan Valley Line is colored orange on New Jersey Transit's system map, and its symbol is the Statue of Liberty, an homage to the Central Railroad of New Jersey, whose logo was also the Statue of Liberty.

Description
Most of the line follows the main line of the former Central Railroad of New Jersey. Historically, CNJ trains ran on this line, as part of its Lehigh-Susquehanna Division, from Scranton, Wilkes-Barre, Allentown, Bethlehem and Easton in eastern Pennsylvania through Elizabeth and Bayonne to Jersey City. In peak years of service the line was the basis for trains such as the Queen of the Valley and the Harrisburg Special, reaching as far west as Harrisburg, Pennsylvania.

Until 1967 CNJ service terminated at the company's Communipaw Terminal in what is today Liberty State Park. This station, which was also served by Reading Company trains to Philadelphia and B & O service to Washington, D.C. and beyond, had connections by chartered bus or ferry into Manhattan.

At the end of April 1967, the Aldene Connection opened, connecting the CNJ main line to the Lehigh Valley Railroad (now Conrail's Lehigh Line), and trains were re-routed to Newark Penn Station on the Northeast Corridor via Hunter Connection. This allowed CNJ to end the ferry service between Jersey City and Manhattan, which was losing money.

The former CNJ Main Line was conveyed to Conrail on the former's bankruptcy in 1976. Conrail sold the line to the state of New Jersey in 1978 but continued to operate commuter service under contract. Service on the line was cut back from Phillipsburg to High Bridge on January 1, 1984.

Trains initially could not go beyond Newark Penn Station to New York Penn Station because the locomotives were diesel-powered, and diesel locomotives cannot operate in the North River Tunnels. The introduction of ALP-45DP dual-mode locomotives allows for direct service to New York Penn Station. Limited service to New York Penn Station started as a pilot program on March 3, 2014. Select trains provide one-seat rides to New York. This original "pilot project" schedule has been subsequently expanded to include additional trains, but is limited to off-peak hours due to capacity issues in the Hudson River tunnels.

Unlike the Northeast Corridor, the majority of stations on the Raritan Valley Line are not wheelchair accessible. Newark Penn Station, Union, Cranford, Westfield, Plainfield, and Somerville are accessible high-platform stations. Roselle Park has a high platform but does not have a ramp or elevator to the street.

In September 2018, all Raritan Valley Line service was truncated to Newark Penn Station to allow for positive train control installation. Direct service to New York resumed on November 4, 2019.

Rolling stock

The Raritan Valley Line uses all diesel service. The locomotives originally consisted of the GP40PH-2(A and B) and Alstom PL42AC with a 5- or 6-car set of Comet series coaches. Since late 2008, Bombardier Multilevel Series Coaches were added and displaced most of the Comet coaches. As of late 2013, the trainsets' consist use an ALP-45DP and a 6- to 8-car set of Multilevels. However, some occasional trains use the Comet coaches coupled with a PL42AC or an ALP-45DP. NJT had acquired several GE P40DC locomotives from Amtrak in 2007, but were soon transferred to ACES in 2009 and then back in 2011 due to a planned discontinuation, which formally took effect in 2012. Due to the lack of buyers, the locomotives stayed in NJT's property indefinitely until 2014, when they were sold to the Connecticut Department of Transportation for their CTrail commuter rail services.

With the initiation of select, direct, service to New York Penn Station on the Raritan Valley Line in March 2014, dual-mode Bombardier ALP-45DP locomotives (combination diesel and electric power) were added to the RVL rolling stock to incorporate the "one seat ride" to and from Raritan or High Bridge and Penn Station in New York.

The line's rolling stock is stored at the Raritan Yard, the line's only rail yard, located just west of the station of the same name. All eastbound trains change crews here and trains are normally stored here overnight. This is also one of two fueling facilities for NJT locomotives (the other is at Hoboken Terminal). All trains terminating in Newark head to the Meadows Maintenance Complex in Kearny, New Jersey to be stored.

In May and June 2018, NJ Transit leased 10 MARC coaches to be exclusively operated on the Raritan Valley Line. These cars have since been sent back to MARC.

Proposed extensions

Phillipsburg
Service beyond High Bridge to Phillipsburg Union Station in Phillipsburg was discontinued in December 1983 because of low ridership. Then, in November 1989, the New Jersey Department of Transportation (NJ DOT) severed the rail line between Alpha and Phillipsburg during construction of I-78. This was done in order to avoid having to build an overpass over the out-of-service trackage.

Since 1984, there have been repeated calls for resumption of service to Phillipsburg to relieve traffic congestion on the parallel I-78 and U.S. Route 22. The Raritan Valley Rail Coalition, formed in 1998 by the late U.S. Congressman Bob Franks, sought cost-effective ways to improve mobility, reduce highway congestion, and increase transit ridership along the Raritan Valley Line. Their study was completed in January 2010. In addition, real estate developers have touted former industrial hub Phillipsburg as an excellent candidate for restored commuter rail service, saying "P'burg. . .a good candidate for rail service..."

NJ Transit has been responsive to the idea, and initiated an environmental impact statement. It was determined that service restoration will take approximately four years and cost $90 million.

In 2010, Easton Mayor Sal Panto Jr. promoted the restoration of rail service to Easton or Phillipsburg and possibly Allentown or Bethlehem.

In 2021, Amtrak placed service to Allentown via the Raritan Valley Line in their 2035 plan.

West Trenton
Another plan that has been proposed is to restore service on the former Reading Railroad's Jersey City branch track between Ewing and Bound Brook which is the current day CSX Transportation Trenton Subdivision, the NJ Transit rail service on the Trenton Subdivision would be NJ Transit's version of the West Trenton Line, providing a direct link to the SEPTA service of the same name and establishing an additional link to Philadelphia. To date, no funding for the proposal has been secured.

Stations

Bibliography

References

 
Central Railroad of New Jersey
NJ Transit Rail Operations
Transportation in Hunterdon County, New Jersey
Transportation in Somerset County, New Jersey
Transportation in Union County, New Jersey